Dame Annette Faye King  (née Robinson, born 13 September 1947) is a former New Zealand politician. She served as Deputy Leader of the New Zealand Labour Party and Deputy Leader of the Opposition from 2008 to 2011, and from 2014 until 1 March 2017. She was a Cabinet Minister in the Fourth and Fifth Labour Governments, and was the MP for the  electorate in Wellington from 1996 to 2017.

Early life
The daughter of Frank Pace Robinson and Olive Annie Robinson (née Russ), King was born in Murchison on 13 September 1947. After receiving primary education in Murchison, she attended Murchison District High School from 1960 to 1963, and then Waimea College in 1964. Between 1965 and 1967, she completed a diploma in school dental nursing, and worked as a dental nurse from 1967 to 1981. In 1981, she gained a Bachelor of Arts degree from the University of Waikato, and obtained a postgraduate diploma in dental nursing the same year. She was a tutor of dental nursing in Wellington from 1982 to 1984. She is partly of Sri Lankan descent.

Political career

King joined the Labour Party in 1972, and has held various offices within the party, including a term on the party's executive (1991–1992). In 1983 King unsuccessfully sought the Labour Party nomination for the seat of Tasman following the retirement of Labour leader Bill Rowling, but lost to Ken Shirley.

Member of Parliament

In the 1984 election, she stood as the party's candidate for Horowhenua, and was successful. She was re-elected in the 1987 election. King was considered one of the most effective backbenchers in the Fourth Labour Government.

Following the 1987 election, she was appointed parliamentary under-secretary to the Minister of Employment and of Social Welfare. In August 1989 she put herself forward to fill one of two vacant seats in cabinet, winning a caucus ballot against ex-minister Richard Prebble. King was appointed Minister of Employment, Minister of Immigration, and Minister of Youth Affairs. She was also given special responsibility for liaising between Cabinet and the party caucus.

In the 1990 election, King lost the Horowhenua electorate against Hamish Hancock, a lawyer who stood for the National Party. She served as chief executive officer of the Palmerston North Enterprise Board from 1991 until the 1993 election, when she was returned to Parliament as the MP for Miramar. In the 1996 election, when the shift to mixed-member proportional (MMP) representation prompted a reorganisation of electorates, King successfully contested the new seat of Rongotai. In that 1996 election, she was ranked in sixth place on the Labour Party's list.

After re-entering parliament new leader Helen Clark appointed her as spokesperson for Immigration and Business & Industry in December 1993. Less than a year later, in October 1994, after Peter Dunne split from Labour, Clark gave King Dunne's commerce and customs portfolios as well. In June 1995, after Clive Matthewson left Labour, King was given Matthewson's position of Shadow Minister of Social Welfare. In August 1997 King was promoted again, replacing Lianne Dalziel as Shadow Minister of Health while relinquishing the Social Welfare portfolio.

Cabinet Minister
When Labour won the 1999 election, and Helen Clark became Prime Minister, King was appointed Minister of Health. She was ranked sixth within Cabinet. After Labour winning a third term in government at the 2005 election, King took on the roles of Minister of Transport and Minister of Police. Following another reshuffle in late 2007, King became the new Minister of Justice. Before the 2008 general election she was elevated to number four on the party list.

Deputy Leader of the Opposition
Labour was defeated in the 2008 election by the National Party led by relative newcomer John Key. King retained her seat with a majority of about 7,800 votes. King was elected as the Deputy Leader of the Labour Party in a special caucus meeting on 11 November 2008, replacing Michael Cullen. Phil Goff, another senior Labour Party member, became the Leader of the Labour Party, replacing former Prime Minister Helen Clark. King stood again for Rongotai in the 2011 general election. She was ranked second on the Labour Party list. Following the defeat of the Labour Party in the 2011 election, Annette King announced she would step down as Deputy Leader of the Labour party, and Deputy Leader of the Opposition effective 13 December 2011. She was succeeded as Deputy Leader by Grant Robertson in the 2011 Labour Party leadership election.

Labour's heavy defeat at the 2014 election caused the resignation of David Cunliffe as the party's leader and the next leadership election, with King in an interim capacity as deputy leader.

Following the election of Andrew Little as the new leader, King remained as deputy in a permanent capacity. Although Little guaranteed that she would be deputy for at least a year, he did not indicate whether he wanted her to be a future Deputy Prime Minister.

She also stepped down from the deputy leader role.

High Commissioner
On 14 November 2018, King was appointed as High Commissioner to Australia by Foreign Affairs Minister Winston Peters.

Honours and awards
King received both the New Zealand 1990 Commemoration Medal, and the New Zealand Suffrage Centennial Medal in 1993.

In 2007, King was awarded a Bravo award by the New Zealand Skeptics for her work along with "industry group Natural Products New Zealand, their attempt to provide standards and accountability via the Therapeutic Products and Medicines Bill."

In the 2018 New Year Honours, King was appointed a Dame Companion of the New Zealand Order of Merit, for services as a member of Parliament.

Family
King is married with one daughter, and has three step-sons. She is a cousin of former National minister Chris Finlayson; King was a second cousin to Finlayson’s mother through her Russ side (the Russ’s were a large Nelson family also related to Chester Borrows.  She received verbal abuse in Parliament from Finlayson in September 2013. Finlayson also opposed her in the Rongotai electorate at the 2008, 2011 and 2014 general elections.

In 2019 an authorized biography of King was published, co-written by John Harvey and Brent Edwards.

Notes

References

		

|-

|-

|-

|-

|-

|-

|-

|-

|-

|-

1947 births
Living people
Members of the Cabinet of New Zealand
New Zealand Labour Party MPs
University of Waikato alumni
People from Murchison, New Zealand
Women government ministers of New Zealand
Unsuccessful candidates in the 1990 New Zealand general election
People educated at Waimea College
Members of the New Zealand House of Representatives
New Zealand MPs for North Island electorates
New Zealand MPs for Wellington electorates
21st-century New Zealand politicians
21st-century New Zealand women politicians
Women members of the New Zealand House of Representatives
New Zealand people of Sri Lankan descent
Dames Companion of the New Zealand Order of Merit
Recipients of the New Zealand Suffrage Centennial Medal 1993
Female justice ministers
Justice ministers of New Zealand
Russ family